KVME-TV (channel 20) is a television station licensed to Bishop, California, United States, serving the Los Angeles television market as an affiliate of Jewelry Television. It is owned by Weigel Broadcasting alongside Avalon-licensed MeTV owned-and-operated station KAZA-TV (channel 54).

History
The station signed on the air on August 21, 2007, as KBBC-TV on analog channel 20, operating as a bilingual independent. KBBC's programming was mostly Spanish, featuring such shows as La Corte del Pueblo (a Spanish-language version of The People's Court), La Corte de Familia, the daily soccer program Fútbol al Día from Monterrey-based Multimedios Televisión, and a newscast with extensive coverage from Central America. The nighttime programming had premiered on KNLA-LP, which was a translator station.

The station later added afternoon and overnight programming from the Home Shopping Network. KBBC also offered English-language religious programming from Hosanna, a Christian program service. On Saturday mornings, English-language children's programs aired along with a public affairs program, Eastern Sierra News.

In March 2012, Venture Technologies Group filed and received approval to sell KNLA-CD and sister station KNET-CD to Local Media TV Holdings. On March 9, KBBC-TV's callsign was changed to KVME-TV.

Affiliation changes

MeTV
KVME-TV became affiliated with MeTV on April 30, 2012, sharing the affiliation with the third digital subchannel of Anaheim-based KDOC-TV (channel 56). KVME-TV carried MeTV on their primary digital channel 20 (virtual channel 20.1), which is also available on the DirecTV and Dish Network local packages tier for the Los Angeles market. KVME-TV and KDOC-TV marketed the subchannel as "MeTV Hollywood," changing from KDOC's previous brand of "MeTV Los Angeles." Local advertising for MeTV Hollywood was sold by a jointly managed ad sales team for both stations. However, KVME-TV's MeTV feed did not carry the full schedule of programming, electing to carry Spanish-language religious and paid programming during the early morning weekday hours of 5 to 8 a.m., preempting regularly-scheduled programming within those hours. The MeTV affiliation ended on January 15, 2018.

Heroes & Icons
On January 15, 2018, KVME-TV became an affiliate of MeTV's sister network, Heroes & Icons, sharing the affiliation with the fourth digital subchannel of Los Angeles-based KCOP-TV (channel 13). Like the previous affiliation with MeTV, KVME-TV's Heroes & Icons feed did not carry the full schedule of programming, electing to carry Spanish-language religious and paid programming during the early morning weekday hours of 7 to 10 a.m., preempting regularly-scheduled programming within those hours. On February 28, 2022, subchannel 20.2 was upgraded to 720p high definition, mirroring low-power sister station, KSFV-CD 27.2 in Los Angeles, which also carries Heroes & Icons in HD.

Jewelry TV
In 2020, KVME-TV changed its affiliation from Heroes & Icons to Jewelry Television; the H&I affiliation was moved to the station's second digital subchannel.

Subchannels
The station's digital signal is multiplexed:

Analog-to-digital transition
Because it was granted an original construction permit after the FCC finalized the DTV allotment plan on April 21, 1997, the station did not receive a companion channel for a digital television station. Instead, on or before June 12, 2009, which was the end of the digital TV conversion period for full-service stations, KVME-TV was required to turn off its analog signal and turn on its digital signal (called a "flash-cut"). On November 30, 2008, KVME completed the transition to digital by turning off its analog signal and immediately turning on its digital signal on channel 20.

References

External links 

Heroes & Icons affiliates
Television channels and stations established in 2007
2007 establishments in California
VME-TV
VME-TV
Weigel Broadcasting